G 2/98 is an opinion of the Enlarged Board of Appeal of the European Patent Office (EPO) issued on May 31, 2001, after a point of law was referred to it by the President of the EPO (pursuant to ). The Enlarged Board of Appeal in G 2/98 provided clarity to that concept.
Namely, the Board held that 

In other words, the Board has ruled that a strict interpretation of ‘the same invention’ is appropriate.

See also 
 Amendments under the European Patent Convention

References

External links 
 Decision G 2/98, 

G 1998 2
2001 in case law
2001 in Europe